The Jackson School District is a comprehensive community public school district, serving students in kindergarten through twelfth grade from Jackson Township, in Ocean County, New Jersey, United States. The district operates six elementary schools serving grades K-5, two middle schools and two high schools. In January 2015, the Jackson Board of Education voted to implement full-day kindergarten, which was introduced in September 2015.

As of the 2018–19 school year, the district, comprising 10 schools, had an enrollment of 8,304 students and 665.1 classroom teachers (on an FTE basis), for a student–teacher ratio of 12.5:1.

The district is classified by the New Jersey Department of Education as being in District Factor Group "DE", the fifth-highest of eight groupings. District Factor Groups organize districts statewide to allow comparison by common socioeconomic characteristics of the local districts. From lowest socioeconomic status to highest, the categories are A, B, CD, DE, FG, GH, I and J.

Awards and recognition
For the 2001-02 school year, Christa McAuliffe Middle School was recognized with the National Blue Ribbon Award from the United States Department of Education, the highest honor that an American school can achieve.

Civil rights case
On May 8, 2010, it was announced that the New Jersey Division on Civil Rights found probable cause against the Jackson school district for violating the New Jersey Law Against Discrimination by allowing a hostile environment to prevail against former Jackson Memorial High School student Daniel Jacobson. Jacobson, who is gay and Honduran, alleged that he was repeatedly harassed and threatened because of his sexual orientation and national origin. The case will likely go to trial by the end of the year.

Schools
Schools in the district (with 2018–19 enrollment data from the National Center for Education Statistics) are:
Elementary schools
Crawford-Rodriguez Elementary School (674 students; in grades PreK-5)
Adriann Jean-Denis, Principal
Elms Elementary School (705; PreK-5)
Michael Burgos, Principal
Lucy N. Holman Elementary School (549; K-5)
Richard Karas, Principal
Howard C. Johnson Elementary School (463; K-5)
Dr. Michael Raymond, Principal
Sylvia Rosenauer Elementary School (307; PreK-5)
Ronald Polakowski, Principal
Switlik Elementary School (751; K-5)
Kathleen McKiernan, Principal
Middle school
Carl W. Goetz Middle School (1,129; 6-8)
Dr. Faith Lessig, Principal
Christa McAuliffe Middle School (845; 6-8)
Debra Phillips, Principal
High school
Jackson Liberty High School (1,177; 9-12)
Geoffrey Brignola, Principal
Jackson Memorial High School (1,620; 9-12) 
Kevin DiEugenio, Principal

Administration
Core members of the district's administration are:

Michelle D. Richardson, Business Administrator / Board Secretary

Board of education
The district's board of education, with nine members, sets policy and oversees the fiscal and educational operation of the district through its administration. As a Type II school district, the board's trustees are elected directly by voters to serve three-year terms of office on a staggered basis, with three seats up for election each year held (since 2012) as part of the November general election.

References

External links
Jackson School District

School Data for the Jackson School District, National Center for Education Statistics

Jackson Township, New Jersey
New Jersey District Factor Group DE
School districts in Ocean County, New Jersey